John Spencer Sharp (born July 28, 1950) is an American Democratic politician from Texas, who has served since 2011 as the chancellor of the Texas A&M University System. From 1991 to 1999, he was the Texas Comptroller of Public Accounts. From 1979 to 1987, he was a member of both houses of the Texas State Legislature. From 1987 to 1991, he was one of the three members of the Texas Railroad Commission. In 1998 and 2002, he was the Democratic Party's nominee for Lieutenant Governor of Texas.

Sharp is also a principal in the Austin office of the Dallas-based Ryan & Company, a tax consulting firm. In 2005, he was appointed to serve as chairman of the Texas Tax Reform Commission. In December 2008, Sharp announced that he would run in 2012 for the United States Senate seat held by the then retiring Republican Kay Bailey Hutchison. However, Sharp never sought the position, having instead been named the Texas A&M System chancellor.

Background
The son of an oil field worker and a school teacher, Sharp grew up in the small farming community of Placedo in Victoria County along the Texas Gulf Coast. In 1972, Sharp earned a Bachelor of Arts degree from Texas A&M University in College Station, where he was a member of Squadron 6 in the Corps of Cadets and was elected Student Body President. Upon graduation, he was commissioned as a second lieutenant in the United States Army Reserves. He belongs to American Legion Post 76 in Austin.

In 1976, Sharp received a master's degree in Public Administration from Texas State University in San Marcos while working full-time in Austin with the Legislative Budget Board. In 1978, Sharp returned to Victoria, Texas, where he opened a real estate firm with partner and former County Commissioner Gene Martin and became a successful small business owner. That same year, he married Charlotte Sharp. The couple has a son, Spencer, and a daughter, Victoria. The Sharps are involved in many community and humanitarian efforts, including airlifts of Jewish families to Israel from Ukraine and Russia.

In 1978, Sharp was elected to the Texas House of Representatives from the 40th District in Victoria and was later named "Outstanding Freshman" by Texas Monthly. Just a few weeks after his re-election for a third full two-year term in the general election of 1982, he ran and won a special election runoff and served a full four-year term in the Texas Senate. He was appointed to the powerful Senate Finance Committee. In 1986, he was elected to the Texas Railroad Commission. In that position, he worked to reform the state's trucking regulations, improve railroad safety, and develop new markets for Texas' abundant supply of clean-burning and efficient natural gas.

Sharp has received numerous awards, including the only "Texas Quality Award" ever presented to a governmental agency. Texas State University presented Sharp with the "Distinguished Alumnus Award" in 1996, where he also taught a course on Texas state government for several semesters in the early 2000s.

Texas politics

In 1990, Sharp was elected as the 35th State Comptroller of Public Accounts for the State of Texas. He was re-elected in 1994. In 1998, he did not seek a third term as comptroller but instead lost the race for lieutenant governor to Rick Perry, 50-48 percent. Sharp ran for lieutenant governor again in 2002, but was defeated 52-46 percent by David Dewhurst, then the Land Commissioner.

Upon taking office as Comptroller, Sharp began working to fulfill his pledge to "make government work more like our most successful businesses." During his eight years as Comptroller, Sharp established the Texas Performance Review (TPR), an ongoing audit on state government. During Sharp's two 4-year terms as Comptroller, the TPR identified more than $8.5 billion in taxpayer savings and changed the way government does business through such innovations as the Council on Competitive Government. Other innovative programs created and implemented by Sharp during these eight years included:

 Texas School Performance Review: An outgrowth of TPR, this program has shown public school districts how to save more than $350 million, while keeping scarce education funds in the classroom where they belong and easing the burden on local taxpayers.
 Texas Window on State Government: The official website for the Texas State Comptroller's Agency was a Sharp innovation during his time as Comptroller. This website – whose stated purpose was to maximize the ability of citizens to engage with the Comptroller's Agency and to access public information more easily – was the first of its kind in the United States, and has served as a model for other state agencies across the country.
 The Texas Tomorrow Fund: A pre-paid college tuition plan that allows over 80,000 Texas families to lock in the future costs of their children's college at about what they would pay today.
Family Pathfinders: Sharp's 1995 welfare reform plan formed the heart of some of the most sweeping changes to public assistance in Texas history. It also led to another of Sharp's innovations—Family Pathfinders, which links welfare families with local civic clubs, congregations and businesses to help get jobs and leave the public assistance rolls behind. The Family Pathfinders website for Tarrant County, Texas (as an example) is here:
The Lone Star Card: First recommended by Sharp in 1991. This program spearheaded the nationwide switch from paper food stamp coupons to computerized bank-type cards and dramatically reduced fraud and abuse in the federal program.

As Comptroller, Sharp also commanded the most successful state lottery start-up in U.S. history. With only 189 employees (compared to California's 1,000 and Florida's 750), Sharp's team put their first tickets on sale seven weeks early and set first-day, first-week, and first-year world sales records. By the time he turned the games over to the new Texas Lottery Commission, the state was $1 billion richer – and Sharp had returned $81 million in unspent administrative funds. Sharp's blueprint for the Texas Lottery was later used by several American states as well as Mexico.

In 2005, Sharp was asked to head an education task force – called the Texas Tax Reform Commission – charged with preparing a bi-partisan education plan for the state. The special session convened on April 17, 2006. Sharp accepted the offer and removed himself as a potential candidate for governor in 2006. The task force issued its final plan several months later, and the legislature adopted it. For his successful efforts, Sharp was later nominated by the Dallas Morning News for "Texan of the Year".

Texas Proposition 15
In 2007, Sharp helped spearhead Texas Proposition 15, a proposed amendment to the Texas Constitution that sought to establish grants for cancer research, grants for cancer prevention and control programs in Texas to mitigate the incidence of cancer, and the purchase of laboratory facilities. Sharp acted as Treasurer for the supporting political action committee, Texans to Cure Cancer. Proposition 15 passed both houses of the Texas Legislature in May 2007 and was approved by the voters in November 2007 by a wide margin.

Senate campaign
On December 4, 2008, Republican U.S. Senator Kay Bailey Hutchison announced the creation of an exploratory committee for the Texas governor's race in 2010. Had she won the governorship, Hutchison would have been required to vacate her Senate seat by January 2011. If she were to stay in the Senate and not run for governor, she would have been up for re-election to the Senate in 2012. On December 8, 2008, Sharp became the first Democrat to announce his intention to run for this Senate seat, regardless of Hutchison's decision. Unlike several other candidates for the office, Sharp did not create an exploratory committee but immediately began raising funds and campaigning in 2009.

The Texas A&M University System

On August 15, 2011, John Sharp was chosen as chancellor of the Texas A&M University System, the second largest system of higher education in Texas, with a statewide network of 11 universities, seven state agencies, two service units and a comprehensive health science center.

A&M System members educate more than 131,000 students and reach another 22 million people through service each year. With more than 28,000 faculty and staff, the A&M System has a physical presence in 250 of the state's 254 counties and a programmatic presence in every one. In 2012, externally funded research expenditures exceeded $783 million to help drive the state's economy.

Leadership

As chancellor of The Texas A&M University System, Sharp has led multiple initiatives to improve efficiency, expand the presence of the A&M System, and serve the needs of the state of Texas.

Some of these initiatives are detailed below:

 New Partnership Puts Texas A&M on Top, Chancellor Says
 Texas A&M System and GlaxoSmithKline receive U.S. Government approval to establish influenza vaccine facility in Texas
 Texas A&M Deal to Outsource Campus Services Formalized
 Texas A&M System Awarded National Center for Innovation
 Texas A&M University officially acquires Texas Wesleyan University law school
 Texas A&M System Launches EmpowerU Website
 Texas A&M lays accountability path for graduation rates, cost effectiveness
 Texas A&M System implementing outsourcing at other campuses
 Texas A&M University System Saving $10 Million of Healthcare
 Adding “Texas A&M” To More A&M System Agencies

References

External links
Chancellor John Sharp profile
John Sharp's curriculum vitae on the Ryan & Co website
"Country Revival: How the straight-talking, coyote-shooting, tobacco-chewing John Sharp has led a bonanza at Texas A&M." (July 2017)
"McReynolds Endorses Sharp for U.S. Senate" (KTRE Lufkin/Nacogdoches (includes video feed), August 20, 2009)
"Sharp Argues for 'Bubbas' in Bid for Senate" (Cherokeean Herald, August 19, 2009)
"Senate Hopeful to Visit Longview" (East Texas Review, 07/08/09)
John Sharp interviewed by Evan Smith on "Texas Monthly Talks" (01/09)
"Working on a Dream: Let's Mark Dr. King's Birthday by Rekindling His Spirit of Public Service" (Written by John Sharp, Burnt Orange Report, 01-19-09)
"Sharp: Stop bailing out Wall Street, start giving Main Street mortgage relief" (Written by John Sharp, Rio Grande Guardian, December 30, 2008)
"Sharp: Don't play the educational blame game" (Written by John Sharp, Austin American-Statesman, December 20, 2008)
"East & South Texas State Legislators Back Sharp in Senate Race" (Capitol Annex, December 12, 2008)
"John Sharp: Let marketplace govern energy industry" (Written by John Sharp, San Antonio Express-News, June 28, 2008)
John Sharp is interviewed about the Texas Tax Reform Commission by Austin's KLRU-TV
"More Welfare Waste – And A Lesson for Manufacturers" (John Sharp and creation of the Lone Star Card) (Evolving Excellence, November 13, 2006)
Text of Governor's Appointment of John Sharp To Lead Tax Reform Panel (November 22, 2005)
"State Comptroller elaborates on `Lone Star Scholars' idea" (Amarillo Global News, January 23, 1998)
"The U.S. Reform Experience: The National Performance Review" (as inspired by John Sharp) (University of North Texas Libraries, 04/06/1997)
"Sharp Drops Smart Bomb" (Austin Chronicle, 02/09/1996)
"Texas Official Is Model for Gore's Public Parsimony" (New York Times, 09/12/1993)
"The Big Audit" (detailed story of John Sharp's creation of the Texas Performance Review) (State Legislatures, 06/03/1993)

1950 births
Living people
People from Victoria County, Texas
Texas A&M University alumni
Businesspeople from Texas
Politicians from Austin, Texas
Chancellors of Texas A&M University System
Democratic Party members of the Texas House of Representatives
Democratic Party Texas state senators
Members of the Railroad Commission of Texas
United States Army officers
Comptrollers of Texas
Military personnel from Texas